Lieutenant-Colonel Sir Walter Hugh Malcolm Ross,  (27 October 1943 – 27 October 2019) was a member of the Royal Household of the Sovereign of the United Kingdom, and from 2006 to 2008, master of the household to Prince Charles.

Early life
Ross was born on 27 October 1943 to Colonel Walter John Macdonald Ross (d. 1982) and Josephine May Cross (d. 1982). His younger brother is (Walter) Robert Alexander Ross (b. 1950), Keeper of the Records of the Duchy of Cornwall until retiring in 2013. He was educated at Eton and Sandhurst. He served in the Scots Guards from 1964 to 1987, holding the posts of Adjutant at the Royal Military Academy Sandhurst 1977–1979, and reaching the rank of Lieutenant-Colonel in 1982.

Career
Ross joined the Royal Household in 1987 as Assistant Comptroller of the Lord Chamberlain's Office and Management Auditor. In 1989 he ceased to be Management Auditor, but remained as Assistant Comptroller until 1990. From 1989 to 1990 he was Secretary of the Central Chancery of the Orders of Knighthood.

He was Comptroller of the Lord Chamberlain's Office 1991–2005, and Master of the Household to the Prince of Wales between 2006 and 2008. From 1988 on he was an Extra Equerry to the Queen.

He was made an OBE in 1988, and joined the Royal Victorian Order in 1994 as a CVO. He was knighted as a KCVO in 1999, and advanced to GCVO in 2005. He was appointed GCStJ in 2016 on becoming the Lord Prior of the Order of St John.

From 1981 on he was a member of the Royal Company of Archers, and a Freeman of the City of London as of 1994.

In 2006, he was made Her Majesty's Lord Lieutenant of the Stewartry of Kirkcudbright, succeeding Sir Norman Arthur. He had been appointed a Deputy Lieutenant in 2003. He retired as Lord Lieutenant on 27 October 2018, when he reached his 75th birthday.

In 2007, he was appointed Non-Executive Chairman to the International Security and Defence group, Westminster Group plc, whilst maintaining his full duties to the Royal Household.

On 1 September 2016 he was appointed as the Lord Prior of the Most Venerable Order of the Hospital of Saint John of Jerusalem.

Honour Ribbons:

 : Royal Victorian Order (GCVO)
 : Order of the British Empire (OBE)
 : Venerable Order of St John (GCStJ)
 : Royal Household Long and Faithful Service Medal (Queen Elizabeth II Version) - 20 years service to the British Royal Family.

Personal life
On 31 January 1969, he married Susan Jane Gow (b. 1949), daughter of General Sir James Michael Gow (1924–2013) and Jane Emily Scott. Through his wife, he was the uncle of Sophie Hunter (b. 1978), the wife of actor Benedict Cumberbatch. Together he and his wife had three children:
 Tabitha Alice Ross (b. 1970)
 Flora Jane Josephine Ross (b. 1974)
 Hector Walter James Ross (b. 1983)

He died on 27 October 2019, his birthday, at the age of 76.

See also
 Extra Equerry to the Queen

References

1943 births
2019 deaths
Knights Grand Cross of the Royal Victorian Order
Officers of the Order of the British Empire
Deputy Lieutenants of Kirkcudbright
Lord-Lieutenants of Kirkcudbright
Equerries
Scots Guards officers
Graduates of the Royal Military Academy Sandhurst
People educated at Eton College
Members of the Household of the Prince of Wales
Members of the Royal Company of Archers
Bailiffs Grand Cross of the Order of St John